Trichopeza is a genus of empidoid flies. They are mainly predatory flies like most of their relatives, and generally small to medium-sized, long-legged and large-eyed.

Species
T. albocincta (Boheman, 1846)
T. chaomek (Plant, 2009)
T. longicornis (Meigen, 1822)
T. milleri Smith, 1989
T. pia (Plant, 2009)
T. taiwanensis Yang & Horvat, 2006

References

Empididae
Diptera of Europe
Taxa named by Camillo Rondani